Megan Marie Hart (born 1983) is an American operatic soprano from Eugene, Oregon, performing in leading operatic roles and concerts in America and Europe.

Education 
Hart was born in Santa Monica, California, and grew up in Eugene, Oregon, after the age of six. Hart has been interested in playing the piano since she was three, and began taking lessons at age nine. In addition, she played the violin for five years, and then started choral singing. In 1999, Hart attended the Oregon Bach Festival's Youth Choral Academy for the first time, led by Anton Armstrong and Helmuth Rilling. Inspired by Rilling, Hart decided to become a professional singer instead of a pianist. Starting in 2001, Hart took professional singing lessons with voice teacher Beverly Park, who encouraged her to study with Richard Miller at the Oberlin Conservatory of Music.
In 2005, Hart received her Bachelor of Music degree from Oberlin Conservatory. In the summer of 2005, Hart was in the Gerdine Young Artists program with the Opera Theatre of Saint Louis, as well as a young artist at Opera North. In October 2005, Hart first met Marilyn Horne at Horne's master class in Oberlin. Hart received her Master of Music degree from Oberlin Conservatory in 2006. She received a Professional Studies Certificate (PS) from Manhattan School of Music, where she studied with Mignon Dunn. She was a participant in Seattle Opera's Young Artist program from 2007 to 2010, where she studied with Jane Eaglen. In 2010 Hart again studied with Marilyn Horne, at the Music Academy of the West, where she won the Marilyn Horne Song Competition. Horne has since remained Hart's teacher.

Career

Opera 
Hart's operatic repertoire spans Baroque roles such as Handel's Alcina, and Almirena in his Rinaldo, leading ladies in Mozart operas such as the Countess in Le nozze di Figaro, Donna Anna in Don Giovanni, and Fiordiligi in Così fan tutte. She appeared in roles from the 20th century, such as Lady Billows in Britten's Albert Herring, the title role in Poulenc's La voix humaine and Blanche in his Dialogues of the Carmelites. She has performed lirico-spinto roles such as Verdi's Aida, Luisa Miller and Gilda in his Rigoletto, Puccini's Mimì in La bohème and Tosca, and Chrysothemis in Elektra by Richard Strauss.

In 2010, a production of Alcina with Bourbon Baroque was staged for a TV recording, that has since repeatedly been aired.

In 2015, Hart joined the ensemble of the Landestheater Detmold, Germany. In 2016 she returned to the role of the woman in La voix humaine in an all female production, staged by Karin Kotzbauer, conducted by Sachie Mallet, in set and costumes by Tatiana Tarwitz, and with dramaturge Elizabeth Wirtz. In 2018, Hart appeared as Tosca for the first time. The production was well received by critics and audience. Hart received her second Theaterring for her debut in the role of Luisa Miller in the following year. Hart left Detmold in 2020 to join the ensemble of the Staatstheater Darmstadt, where she returned to the roles of Mimì in La bohème and Donna Anna in Don Giovanni, and gave her role debuts as Elsa in Wagner's Lohengrin, Liù in Puccini's Turandot and Madeleine de Faublas in Abraham's operetta Ball im Savoy. Hart was invited back as a guest to the Landestheater Detmold in 2022 for her debut as Cio-Cio-San in Puccini's Madama Butterfly. The production was tenor Zoran Todorovich's debut as director, and conductor Per-Otto Johansson’s premiere as Generalmusikdirektor.

Concerts 
In 2008 Hart performed with the early music ensemble Bourbon Baroque. The same year, she made her first TV appearance as a professional singer as the soprano soloist in Beethoven's Ninth Symphony with the Seattle Symphony in a concert for the Dalai Lama and Desmond Tutu. With the same orchestra she sang in a Holiday Pops concert conducted by Marvin Hamlisch, where she premiered his song Chanukah Lights, an original composition written for the occasion. In 2009 she performed art songs composed by Lazar Weiner, a survivor of the Holocaust, with Music of Remembrance. With the same ensemble she sang the soprano solo in Shostakovich's song cycle From Jewish Folk Poetry in 2010. The same year, she performed excerpts from Rufus Wainwright's Prima Donna in a concert with the Oregon Symphony.

Hart made her Carnegie Hall debut with art songs by Franz Liszt in January 2012. She returned in March of the same year to perform in the winners concert of the Liederkranz Foundation competition, where she had won first place in the Lieder category. In the summer of 2012, Hart sang in concerts with conductor Eve Queler, who she previously had worked with in a production of Le nozze di Figaro at Oberlin. In 2013 and 2015 Hart performed arias in concerts with orchestras in Germany. In 2016, she sang the soprano solo in Mendelssohn's oratorio Elijah. In autumn 2017, Hart sang the soprano solo in Mahler's Resurrection Symphony. Hart performed Mozart's concert aria "Misera, dove son? (KV 369)" with Generalmusikdirektor  in her last concert as Landestheater Detmold ensemble member in June 2020, and sang her first concert as ensemble member of the Staatstheater Darmstadt with Generalmusikdirector Daniel Cohen in September 2020.

Hart's 2021 recital Famous Musicians of Jewish Origin with pianist Giacomo Marignani was the official opening event of the Darmstadt celebrations in the nationwide festival year  commemorating the first documented mention of Jewish communities in the territory of present-day Germany. In several sold out performances at the Staatstheater and the Darmstadt Synagogue, she sang Simon Sargon's Shema: 5 Poems of Primo Levi, Korngold's Drei Lieder, Op. 22, Viktor Ullmann's Drei Sonette aus dem Portugiesischen, Op. 29, and the grand opera arias "Il va venir" from Halévy's La Juive, "Pourquoi suis-je venue" from Saint-Saëns' Proserpine and "Robert, toi que j'aime" from Meyerbeer's Robert le diable.

Awards and recognition 

 Marilyn Horne Song Competition 2010, Grand Prize Winner
 Liederkranz Foundation Competition 2012, First Place, Art Song division
 Theaterring Detmold 2018, Winner best singer
 Theaterring Detmold 2019, Winner best singer

References

External links 

 
 Megan Marie Hart Operabase
 Megan Marie Hart on the Staatstheater Darmstadt website
 Megan Marie Hart on the Landestheater Detmold website
 Megan Marie Hart (in German) wieland-artists-management.de
 Megan Marie Hart on opera-arias.com
 Megan Marie Hart on IMDb
  

1983 births
Living people
American operatic sopranos
Oberlin Conservatory of Music alumni
Manhattan School of Music alumni
Music Academy of the West alumni
Women performers of early music
American performers of early music
Jewish opera singers
Jewish American classical musicians
Jewish women singers
Musicians from Eugene, Oregon
Musicians from Santa Monica, California
21st-century American opera singers
21st-century American women opera singers
Singers from Oregon
Marilyn Horne Song Competition winners
Classical musicians from Oregon
Singers from California
Classical musicians from California
21st-century American Jews